The 1981 Scheldeprijs was the 68th edition of the Scheldeprijs cycle race and was held on 28 July 1981. The race was won by Ad Wijnands.

General classification

References

1981
1981 in road cycling
1981 in Belgian sport
July 1981 sports events in Europe